The Carnival Tour was a U.S./Mexico concert tour by Haitian hip-hop musician Wyclef Jean. The tour began on February 9, 2018 and ended on October 26, 2018. The Tour was announced on December 25, 2017 on Wyclef's social media accounts

Background 
The tour is in support of Wyclef's seventh studio album Carnival III: The Fall and Rise of a Refugee. The tour will feature other artists such as Beards, Victory Soul Orchestra, The Age, DJ Trumpmastr, and The Knocks. In four of Wyclef's shows, a full orchestra will be featured just as it did at his show at Carnegie Hall in 1998. On December 25, 2017, he announced that he would be teaming up with Live Nation Entertainment Company to feature a full orchestra in Omaha, Columbus, St. Louis, and Dallas. The four shows will each be considered a leg and be called "A Night of Symphonic Hip Hop," and will feature some of the Philadelphia Orchestra. Wyclef has already announced that at these shows he will perform his hit solo song "Gone till November," and his hit song with the Fugees "Killing Me Softly with His Song."

Shows 
List of concerts, showing date, city, country, venue, opening acts, tickets sold, and number of available tickets

References 

Wyclef Jean
2018 concert tours
Concert tours of North America